Molly McClure (born Mary Ella Karnes; January 19, 1919 – August 15, 2008) was an American film and television actress She appeared in films and televisions series such as Daddy's Dyin': Who's Got the Will?, Murphy Brown, Mrs. Doubtfire, City Slickers II: The Legend of Curly's Gold, Walker, Texas Ranger and Pure Country.

Filmography

References

External links

 https://www.findagrave.com/memorial/86013530/molly-mcclure

American film actresses
American television actresses
1919 births
2008 deaths
20th-century American actresses
21st-century American women